Dennis Lim (born in Singapore) is a Singaporean retired footballer.

References

Living people
Singaporean footballers
Singaporean sportspeople of Chinese descent
Year of birth missing (living people)
Association footballers not categorized by position
Balestier Khalsa FC players
21st-century Singaporean people